In mathematics, The fundamental theorem of topos theory states that the slice  of a topos  over any one of its objects  is itself a topos. Moreover, if there is a morphism  in  then there is a functor  which preserves exponentials and the subobject classifier.

The pullback functor 
For any morphism f in  there is an associated "pullback functor"  which is key in the proof of the theorem.

Note that a topos  is isomorphic to the slice over its own terminal object, i.e. , so for any object A in  there is a morphism  and thereby a pullback functor , which is why any slice  is also a topos.

For a given slice  let  denote an object of it, where X is an object of the base category. Then  is a functor which maps: . This yields
 

Logical interpretation 
If these are the case then, by theorem, the formula  is true in the slice , because the terminal object  of the slice factors through its extension . In logical terms, this could be expressed as

so that slicing  by the extension of  would correspond to assuming  as a hypothesis. Then the theorem would say that making a logical assumption does not change the rules of topos logic.

See also 
 Timeline of category theory and related mathematics
 Deduction Theorem

References 

Topos theory